The , located in Ise, Mie Prefecture of Japan, is a Shinto shrine dedicated to the sun goddess Amaterasu.

The Inner Shrine, Naikū (also officially known as "Kōtai Jingū"), is located in the town of Uji-tachi, south of central Ise, and is dedicated to the worship of Amaterasu, where she is believed to dwell. The shrine buildings are made of solid cypress wood and use no nails but instead joined wood. The Outer Shrine, Gekū (also officially known as "Toyouke Daijingū"), is located about six kilometers from Naikū and dedicated to Toyouke-Ōmikami, the god of agriculture, rice harvest and industry. Besides Naikū and Gekū, there are an additional 123 Shinto shrines in Ise City and the surrounding areas, 91 of them connected to Naikū and 32 to Gekū.

Purportedly the home of the Sacred Mirror, the shrine is one of Shinto's holiest and most important sites. Access to both sites is strictly limited, with the general public not allowed beyond sight of the thatched roofs of the central structures, hidden behind four tall wooden fences. However, tourists are free to roam the forest, including its ornamental walkways which date back to the Meiji period.

During the Edo period, it is estimated that one out of ten Japanese conducted an Okage Mairi pilgrimage to the shrine. Accordingly, pilgrimage to the shrine flourished in both commercial and religious frequency. According to historical documents, 3.62 million people visited the shrine in 50 days in 1625, and 1.18 million people visited the shrine in three days in 1829 when the grand festival held every 20 years was held. Because the shrine is considered sanctuary, no security checkpoints were conducted, as it was considered sacrilege by the faithful. The two main shrines of Ise are joined by a pilgrimage road that passes through the old entertainment district of Furuichi.

The chief priest or priestess of Ise Shrine must come from the Imperial House of Japan and is responsible for watching over the Shrine. The current high priestess of the shrine is Emperor Emeritus Akihito's daughter, Sayako Kuroda.

Ise Grand Shrine still has controversy related to colonialism and militarism during the Empire of Japan.

Establishment of the Shrine

According to the Nihon Shoki, around 2000 years ago the divine Yamatohime-no-mikoto, daughter of the Emperor Suinin, set out from Mt. Miwa in modern Nara Prefecture in search of a permanent location to worship the goddess Amaterasu, wandering for 20 years through the regions of Omi and Mino. Her search eventually brought her to Ise, in modern Mie Prefecture, where she is said to have established Naikū after hearing the voice of Amaterasu saying "(Ise) is a secluded and pleasant land. In this land I wish to dwell." Before Yamatohime-no-mikoto's journey, Amaterasu had been worshiped at the imperial residence in Yamato, then briefly at Kasanui in the eastern Nara basin. When Princess Yamatohime-no-mikoto arrived at the village of Uji-tachi, she set up fifty bells to designate the area as enshrined for the goddess Amaterasu, which is why the river is called the Isuzu, or "fifty bells".

Besides the traditional establishment date of 4 BC, other dates of the 3rd and 5th centuries have been put forward for the establishment of Naikū and Gekū respectively. The first shrine building at Naikū was erected by Emperor Tenmu (678–686), with the first ceremonial rebuilding being carried out by his wife, Empress Jitō, in 692.

The shrine was foremost among a group of shrines which became objects of imperial patronage in the early Heian period. In 965, Emperor Murakami ordered imperial messengers to be sent to report important events to the guardian kami of Japan. These heihaku were initially presented to 16 shrines including the Ise Shrine.

Chief priestess / chief priest

From the late 7th century until the 14th century, the role of chief priestess of Ise Shrine was carried out by a female member of the Imperial House of Japan known as a saiō. According to the Man'yōshū, the first saiō to serve at the shrine was Princess Ōku, daughter of Emperor Tenmu, during the Asuka period. Mention of Ise Shrine's saiō is also made in the Aoi, Sakaki and Yugao chapters of The Tale of Genji as well as in the 69th chapter of The Tales of Ise. The saiō system ended during the turmoil of the Nanboku-chō period.

During the Empire of Japan and the establishment of State Shinto, the position of chief priest of the Ise Shrine was fulfilled by the reigning emperor and the Meiji, Taisho and Shōwa Emperors all played the role of chief priest during their reigns.
	
Since the disestablishment of State Shinto during the Occupation of Japan, the offices of chief priest and most sacred priestess have been held by former members of the imperial family or their descendants. He succeeded Kitashirakawa Michihisa, a great-grandson of Emperor Meiji, in 2007. Takatsukasa Kazuko was succeeded by her younger sister, Ikeda Atsuko. In 2012, Ikeda was joined by her niece Sayako Kuroda, sole daughter of Emperor Akihito, to serve as a high priestess under her. On 19 June 2017, Sayako officially replaced her aunt as supreme priestess.

Shrine architecture

The architectural style of the Ise shrine is known as shinmei-zukuri, characterized by extreme simplicity and antiquity; its basic principles date back to the Kofun period (250–538 C.E.).  The shrine buildings use a special variant of this style called , which may not be used in the construction of any other shrine. Yuitsu-shinmei-zukuri style replicates the architectural features of early rice granaries. The old shrines are dismantled and new ones built on an adjacent site to exacting specifications every 20 years at exorbitant expense, so that the buildings will be forever new and forever ancient and original. The present buildings, dating from 2013, are the 62nd iteration to date and are scheduled for rebuilding in 2033.

The shrine at Naikū is constructed of Japanese cypress. Built on pillars set directly in the ground, the shrine building measures 10.9 by 5.5 meters and includes a raised floor, verandas all the way around the building and a staircase leading to a single central doorway. The Naikū does not have any windows. The roof is made of thatched reed with ten billets (katsuogi) located on the ridge of the roof, the bargeboards of which project beyond the roof to form the distinctive forked finials (chigi) at the ends of the ridge. The chigi on the roof of the Naikū are flat on top, rather than pointed, which serves as a distinction for the gender of the deity being represented. In the case of Ise, Amaterasu, a female deity, is represented at the shrine, which is why the chigi are flat. The roof ridge is supported by two free-standing columns called the munamochi-bashira. The katsuogi, chigi and munamochi-bashira are stylised forms of older storehouse building techniques that pre-date the introduction of Buddhist architecture in Japan.

The empty site beside the shrine building, the site where the previous shrine once stood and where the next will be built, is called the kodenchi. This area is strewn with large white pebbles and is left totally empty apart from the oi-ya, a small wooden hut containing a wooden pole a little over 2 metres in height called the shin-no-mihashira (new sacred central pole). When a new shrine is built, it is built around the sacred central pole before the removal of the oi-ya, so that the central pole is never seen. The central pole of the old shrine will then have a new oi-ya erected so that the shin-no-mihashira also remains unseen.

Rebuilding the Shrine

The shrine buildings at Naikū and Gekū, as well as the Uji Bridge, are rebuilt every 20 years as a part of the Shinto belief in tokowaka (常若), which means renewing objects to maintain a strong sense of divine prestige in pursuit of eternity, and as a way of passing building techniques from one generation to the next. The twenty-year renewal process is called the Shikinen Sengū. Although the goal of Sengū is to get the shrine built within the 20-year period, there have been some instances, especially because of war, where the shrine building process is postponed or delayed. The original physical purpose of the Sengu process is unknown. However, it is believed that it serves to maintain the longevity of the shrine, or possibly as a gesture to the deity enclosed within the shrine. Historically, this cyclical reconstruction has been practiced for many years in various shrines throughout Japan, meaning that it is not a process exclusive to Ise. The entire reconstruction process takes more or less 17 years, with the initial years focusing on project organization and general planning, and the last 8 years focusing on the physical construction of the shrine.

The shrine has evolved throughout the years in its reconstruction, while maintaining some of its key features. The shrine was not originally constructed with gold copper adornments; however, because of advancements in technology as well as Buddhist influence, it gained them over the years. Another example of Buddhist influence on the shrine is the use of Suedama, which are Buddhist orbs seen on various religious structures. It symbolizes a sacred jewel, and is comparable to nyoi-shu, orbs which many Buddhist figures are displayed holding. Initially, the shrine was constructed of locally sourced Hinoki wood, which served as an ideal building material due to its physical properties. The abundance of local Hinoki wood was short lived, and the shrine currently obtains the wood through other domestic producers, who ensure that only the best wood is being used for the construction. Before the wood is usable in building the shrine, it must be put through a lengthy seasoning and drying process where it is in a pond for several years and then dried.

The team which builds the shrine is typically formed around a few factors. Since many of the building techniques haven't changed since the creation of the Ise Shrine, the workers who are hired to build the shrine must be skilled in specific techniques. Power tools are not allowed within the area of the shrine, which means that skilled artisans and carpenters known as miyadaiku are necessary in the construction process. The unit of workers is also organized around relative skill levels, and less experienced workers will work on smaller tasks than more experienced workers. The importance of hiring specifically local artisans has decreased throughout time, for the pool of available miyadaiku has thinned out. Specialized work and the specific materials come with a cost; in 2013, the shrine was built from private donations alone, totaling 57 billion Japanese Yen (US$550 million).

In August, in a long-standing tradition, the people who live in Ise are allowed to enter the area around the Inner Sanctum of the Naiku as well as the Geku. Some villages drag a wooden carriage laden with white stones up the Isuzu River onto the grounds of the Naiku. Each participant gets two white stones in a white handkerchief and these allow them to place the stones in the area around the Inner Sanctum. Other villages drag a huge wooden cart or Noburi Kuruma laden with white stones to the Uji bridge at the entrance of the grounds of the Naiku.  Participants receive two white stones which are also placed in the sacred space around the Inner Sanctum.  The entire tradition is called Shiraisshiki and it is very colourful with every participant wearing a happi coat representing a particular village. The rebuilding of the main shrine takes place on a site adjacent to the old, and each rebuilding alternates between the two sites. The next scheduled rebuilding of Naikū is due in 2033 on the lower, northern site. Various other religious ceremonies are held with the completion of the shrine, each serving different purposes.

In the lead-up to the rebuilding of the shrines, a number of festivals are held to mark special events. The Okihiki Festival is held in the spring over two consecutive years and involves people from surrounding towns dragging huge wooden logs through the streets of Ise to Naikū and Gekū. In the lead-up to the 2013 rebuilding, the Okihiki festival was held in 2006 and 2007. A year after the completion of the Okihiki festival, carpenters begin preparing the wood for its eventual use in the Shrine.

Annual festivals

From the late seventh century, when the festivals and offerings of Ise Shrine became more formalised, a number of annual events have been performed at both Naikū and Gekū. The Tsukinamisai, which was held in June and December, as well as the Kannamesai Festival in September, were the only three offerings performed by the Saiō, an imperial princess who served as high priestess of the shrine until the 14th century. These offerings are based on the cycle of the agricultural year and are still performed today.

The first important ceremony of the modern calendar year is the Kinensai, where prayers are offered for a bountiful harvest. Kazahinomisai, where prayers for fair weather and sufficient rains are made, is held twice a year in May and August at both Naikū and Gekū.

Held in October each year, this ritual makes offerings of the first harvest of crops for the season to Amaterasu. An imperial envoy carries the offering of rice harvested by the Emperor himself to Ise, as well as five-coloured silk cloth and other materials, called heihaku.

Besides the agricultural ceremonies already mentioned, ceremonies and festivals are held throughout the year at both Naikū and Gekū to celebrate things such as the new year, the foundation of Japan, the past emperors, purification rituals for priests and court musicians, good sake fermentation and the Emperor's birthday. There are also daily food offerings to the shrine kami held both in the mornings and evenings.

Naikū – the inner shrine

The official name of the main shrine of Naikū is Kotaijingu and is the place of worship of the goddess Amaterasu. The grounds of Naikū contain a number of structures, including the following:

The Uji Bridge

This 100 meter wooden bridge, built in a traditional Japanese style, stretches across the Isuzu River at the entrance of Naikū. Like the shrine buildings of Naikū, it is rebuilt every 20 years as a part of the Shikinen Sengū ceremony. The bridge is typically built by carpenters with less experience to gain more skills before moving on to take on the task of working on the main shrine. On crossing the bridge, the path turns to the right along the banks of the Isuzu river and passes through large landscaped gardens.

Temizusha

After crossing a short, wide bridge, pilgrims to the shrine encounter the Temizusha, a small, roofed structure containing a pool of water for use in ritual purification. Visitors are encouraged to wash their hands and rinse their mouths at Temizusha as a symbolic act to clean the mind and body of impurity. The first of two large torii gates stands just beyond the Temizusha.

Saikan and Anzaisho
After passing the first large torii gate, the Purification Hall (Saikan), and the hall for visitors from the imperial household (Anzaisho) is located to the left. The Saikan is used by shrine priests to purify themselves before performing ceremonies at the shrine. They are required to spend one or two nights to free their minds of worldly issues, partaking in baths and eating meals cooked with the sacred fire.

Kaguraden

This hall for special prayer, located just after the second large torii gate, is open to the public for the offering of individual prayers to the kami, the giving of donations and the purchase of special talisman of protection, amulets and hanging scrolls of Amaterasu Omikami.

Imibiyaden

This hall contains the sacred fire used to cook all of the food offerings to the kami of Ise Shrine. Rice and other offerings cooked on the sacred fire are stored in a box made of Japanese cypress, then purified at the Haraedo immediately in front of the Imibiyaden before being offered to the kami.

Kōtai Jingū – the main shrine
The pilgrimage path then approaches the fence of the inner sanctum (昇殿, shōden) of Naikū by a set of large stone steps. Within another set of fencing inside the gate is the main shrine (正宮, seigū) itself. Visitors are supposed to keep to the sides of the path as the middle is set aside for the goddess Amaterasu. Etiquette is the same as for most Shinto shrines. Though the actual shrine is hidden behind a large fence, pilgrims can approach the gate to offer their prayers.  Photographs in this area are prohibited and this restriction is strictly policed.

Kotai Jingū is said to hold the Sacred Mirror, one of three Imperial Regalia of Japan said to have been given to the first Emperor by the gods. From a path that follows the line of the outer wall, the distinctive roof of the shrine building can be seen through the trees. In front of the walled shrine compound can be seen an open area which was the location of the rebuilding of the shrine in 2013.

Pilgrimage at Ise 

The pilgrimage to the Ise shrine, also known as Sangū, gained immense popularity during the Edo Period, where hundreds of thousands of pilgrims would travel there every year. The growth was exponential, 5 million pilgrims visiting the shrine in the year 1830 alone. By the late 19th century, tourists from abroad began to visit and document Ise. The popularity of making a trip to Ise resulted in vast networks and groups of travelers, which ultimately led to businesses working to benefit from this influx of interest for the shrine. Travel guidebooks were made to aid travelers in their navigation, as well to let them know of specific important places to visit while at Ise. They also included woodblock prints of the shrine that were very appealing to those who had made the long trek to the shrine. Additionally, people wanted souvenirs, which resulted in a variety of vendors at Ise selling general goods and specialty items. There were also various post stations which had specific gifts, many of which were woodblock prints. The pilgrimage had multiple purposes and appeals. It was seen as a purification process, and by visiting Ise,  pilgrims were purified and aided in receiving a good afterlife. It also was seen as a vacation, the journey to the shrine itself being almost as important as actually getting there. In the 21st century, Ise is still an important destination both to foreign tourists and especially to the Japanese community; 9 million Japanese tourists visited the shrine in 2013.

Shrines and facilities

Shrines 
There are 125 shrines within Ise Shrine:

Facilities

See also

 List of Shinto shrines
 Association of Shinto Shrines
 Modern system of ranked Shinto shrines
 Saiō
 Sugari no Ontachi One of the sacred treasures of Ise Grand Shrine
 Twenty-Two Shrines

Notes

References
 
 
 
 
 
 Hvass, Svend M. (1998). Ise Japan's Ise Shrines Ancient yet New. Copenhagen. Aristo Publishing. 
 Ponsonby-Fane, Richard. (1962). Studies in Shinto and Shrines. Kyoto: Ponsonby Memorial Society. OCLC 399449

External links

 
 Ise Jingu – Iseshima General Sightseeing Guide
 Ise City Tourist Industry Society
 New York Public Library Digital Gallery, early photograph of Ise Shrine compound
 Photographs of the Ise Shrine by Yoshio Watanabe, Canadian Centre for Architecture
 Smithsonian Magazine – This Japanese Shrine
 Wheelchair Accessibility of Shrine
 

 
7th-century establishments in Japan
Jingū
Shinto shrines in Mie Prefecture
Asuka period
Yayoi period
Sun temples
Japanese imperialism and colonialism
Rebuilt buildings and structures in Japan
Religious buildings and structures completed in 692
7th-century Shinto shrines
Jongmyo shrines
Ise, Mie